Reem Saleh Riyashi ( Rīm Ṣāliḥ ar-Riyāshī; 1981 – 14 January 2004) was a Palestinian suicide bomber from Gaza City who killed herself and four Israelis at the Erez crossing on January 14, 2004. Hamas and the Al-Aqsa Martyrs Brigade claimed that the attack by Riyashi was a joint operation mounted as a response to weeks of Israeli incursions into West Bank cities that had left about 25 Palestinians dead.

Unlike most bombers, Riyashi came from a wealthy family. She was the eighth Palestinian female suicide bomber, but only the second to have left behind children. Riyashi was the first female suicide bomber sent by Hamas whose spiritual leader at the time, Sheikh Ahmed Yassin had initially objected to the involvement of women in such actions, altering this position shortly before his assassination by Israel in March 2004.
She was the wife of a local Hamas commander and according to Israeli security sources she was involved in a extramarital affair with another Hamas commander from Gaza. Her suicide was planned by the two and it meant to clean her name and honor.

Videotaped message

Wearing combat fatigues and holding an automatic rifle with a rocket-propelled grenade in the foreground, Riyashi said that since age 13 she had dreamed of turning "my body into deadly shrapnel against the Zionists".

She continued: "I always wanted to be the first woman to carry out a martyrdom operation, where parts of my body can fly all over ... God has given me two children. I love them [with] a kind of love that only God knows, but my love to meet God is stronger still."

The attack

Riyashi detonated a 2kg bomb inside a building where the thousands of Palestinians who cross each day from Gaza to work in a neighbouring industrial zone are processed.

The Israeli army reported that when she reached the metal detector at the terminal, Riyashi pretended to be crippled and claimed to have metal plates in her leg which would sound the alarm. She asked to have a body search instead. After being taken to an area where a group of soldiers and policemen were checking bags, she was told to wait for a woman to come and search her in a cubicle. It was then that she detonated the explosive device.

Two Israeli soldiers, a policeman and a civilian security worker were killed. Seven other Israelis and four Palestinians were injured.

Victims
 Staff Sergeant Tzur Or, 20, of Rishon Lezion
 Corporal Andrei Kegeles, 19, of Nahariya
 Gal Shapira, 29, of Ashkelon
 Staff Sergeant Vladimir Trostinsky, 22, of Rehovot

Reaction

Family reaction

A traditional memorial tent was immediately set up by her family near her home in Gaza City. Riyashi's relatives had no explanation for why a mother with children so young would choose to become a suicide bomber. At the time of Riyashi's death, her son Obeida was three years old, and her daughter Doha only 18 months old.

Her brother-in-law, Yusuf Awad said, "I denounce her attack ... I support peace. We don't accept women doing such things. She has two children. It is not right."

Reaction among the Palestinian public

Criticism of the operation in the Palestinian press was unprecedented. Hamas endured widespread criticism from among Palestinians, and even among some supporters, for deploying a young mother as a suicide bomber and for publishing photographs of Riyashi posing with her children and weapons. In one photograph, Riyashi's son is clutching what appears to be a mortar shell and is wearing a Hamas headband while another picture shows Riyashi gazing at her children.

Hani Almasri, a Palestinian journalist at Al-Ayyam, told the Associated Press that Hamas' decision to release the photographs damaged the Palestinian cause and that Hamas would gain little advantage by these actions since in his opinion, there was less support from among the Palestinian people for military operations than had been the case previously.

Hamas defended its decision to release the photographs stating that the pictures revealed the depth of the despair of Palestinian women and the depth of their desire to defeat the occupation. Sheikh Ahmad Yassin said that Riyashi's example would inspire more women to die in the fight against Israel, urging more to volunteer.

Reaction in the Arab world

 A 15 January editorial in the Egyptian government daily Al-Gomhuria stated: "The Gaza Shahida Reem Saleh Al-Riyashi, 21, yesterday provided new proof that the Palestinian people stands fast in the face of the Israeli plans that aspire to determine facts on the ground, to steal the Palestinian land, and to surround it with an oppressive fence ... Yesterday [Ariel] Sharon stood before the Knesset threatening to impose his unilateral separation plan on the Palestinians within six months, as he relies on his accursed fence, his violent military forces, the international impotence to restrain his fanatical racist behavior, and the support of the international forces dancing to his tune accusing the Palestinians of terror. Reem, the girl from Gaza, came to answer those threats, to blow up the Israeli force at the Erez crossing, and to kill and wound. Does Sharon or any of his commanders or supporters have the courage to accuse this heroine of carrying out a terror operation? The entire world knows that resistance to the occupation is the legitimate right of all peoples, past, present, and future. [The entire world knows that] no force, whatever it may be, can deny this eternal right to the Palestinian people."
 In the government daily evening newspaper, Al-Masaa, columnist Al-Sayyid Al-'Azawi wrote: "Last Wednesday, the [Israeli] security forces' sirens at the Erez crossing sounded when the Palestinian lady Reem Saleh Al-Riyashi approached them. She succeeded in deceiving the occupation soldiers who gathered around her, claiming that it was the platinum bolts in her leg that set off the alarm of the detectors. They gathered to check her thoroughly, but when she saw a number of soldiers around her, she blew herself up, causing the death and wounding of 14 soldiers. Reem met her death as a Shahida embracing her rifle, underlining with unprecedented courage her love for her two small children – her son of three and her daughter of a year and a half – martyring herself in defense of land, honor, family, and the [previous] Shahids.
 In the Egyptian weekly Al-Usbou, Ahmad Mansour wrote in "Reem Al-Riyashi Is Not Just a Woman:" "Every girl dreams about becoming a mother and enveloping her children with motherly warmth, tenderness, and kindness, and caring for their development just as the farmer cares for the seedlings. But Reem Al-Riyashi decided otherwise. After realizing some of every mother's dreams, she had to realize a childhood dream that haunted her; to become a human bomb and to blow up part of the dreams of the Israeli plunderers who made the lives of Palestinians hell. Despite her strong motherly instincts ... Reem Al-Riyashi had a heart that was bound to a greater emotion than her feelings towards her children, one that not every woman can bear and implement ... She looked at her place in paradise and at the long columns of children martyrs and their parents and decided not to falter, because after all she would be a source of pride for her own children ... Before Reem Al-Riyashi there were six female martyrs… Certainly each one of them had the same emotions as all other women, but they were not interested only in matters that occupy women in the here and now, they were human souls walking among human beings and carrying within them the traits of angels and supreme human aspirations..."
 On 15 January 2004, Walid Jumblatt, Lebanese Member of Parliament and head of the Progressive-Socialist party stated: "Yesterday, the Palestinian mother Reem Al-Riyashi sacrificed herself, and by so doing joined the columns of the brave Jihad warriors and broke the atrocious and troublesome Arab silence, the helplessness, and the retreat that precede failure and disintegration. She offered hope in a sea of complacency, indecisiveness, and fear. It is a new Intifada. It is the Intifada of the revolutionary Palestinian woman and of the land, opposing the 'Jewification' [of Palestine], the Jewish reality, and the Arab regimes. Did it come out of despair? No, and again no. It is an act of belief and it is the correct path, because the fall of one Jew, whether soldier or civilian, is a great accomplishment in times of decline, subservience, and submissiveness, as a way to undermine the plan to 'Jewify' all of Palestine."
 Sate' Nour Al-Din, columnist for the Lebanese pro-Syrian daily Al-Safir wrote: "... This operation was exemplary: [The Erez crossing] is the crossing of daily humiliation and insult to thousands of Palestinians. Her timing was precise: [This] is a response to the Israeli boast that the Palestinian is on the verge of collapse and submission under the weight of the war of annihilation. Its results were ideal: four killed and 10 wounded, Israeli military personnel specializing in humiliating Palestinian workers seeking a crust of bread." Nour Al-Din, however, took issue with the use of a young mother for such an operation, writing that, "in the past and in the present, political Palestinian logic has prevented, prohibited, or simply objected to turning to such a final 'weapon'" and that such an action would, "send several negative messages – one of which was that the members and youths of the movement cannot get past the Israeli fortifications and military positions, and that no path remains to them but to deceive the Israeli soldiers in this 'intelligent' way. [It will] result only in greater Israeli violence, particularly against Palestinian women, and the Israelis will not be deterred from killing the children of the Shahida, Reem..."

Cultural depictions
Riyashi's children appeared on a 2009 episode of Palestinian children's TV show Tomorrow's Pioneers. The hosts create a musical re-enactment video of Riyashi's preparation for martyrdom that they display for the children in an attempt to explain that "her homeland [was more precious than] her own flesh and blood." The episode ends with Riyashi's eldest daughter vowing to become a Jihadi martyr when she grows up, and then Saraa delivers a stern warning addressed to "the occupier" that they "will continue in the footsteps of ... Reem Riyashi ... until [they] liberate [their] homeland."

References

See also

 Suicide bomber
 Female suicide bomber
 Palestinian political violence
 Al-Aqsa Intifada
 Andalib Suleiman
 Ayat al-Akhras
 Hanadi Jaradat
 Wafa Idris

1982 births
2004 deaths
Palestinian militants
Palestinian female murderers
Palestinian casualties in the Second Intifada
People from Gaza City
Suicides in the Palestinian territories
Muslim Brotherhood women
Hamas bombers
Female suicide bombers
Palestinian mass murderers